Williams Harbour Airport  is an abandoned airport located adjacent to William's Harbour, Newfoundland and Labrador, Canada. The community was entirely resettled in 2017.

Former airlines and destinations

References

External links

Defunct airports in Newfoundland and Labrador